Narka may refer to:
 Narka, California
 Narka, Kansas